Danielle Ammaccapane (born November 27, 1965) is an American professional golfer playing on the LPGA Tour. Her daughter, with husband Rod Kesling, is child actor Laura Ann Kesling.

Amateur career
Ammaccapane was born in Babylon, New York. She had a successful junior and amateur career and won the U.S. Women's Amateur Public Links in 1985. She played her collegiate golf at Arizona State University becoming NCAA National Champion in 1985, All-American First team in 1985 and 1986 and All-American Second team in 1987. She was also All-Conference First team from 1984–1987 and won the Pac-10 championship in 1987. She became a member of the Arizona State University Athletic Hall of Fame in 1997.

She represented the United States in the 1986 Curtis Cup.

Professional wins (7)

LPGA Tour wins (7)

Team appearances
Amateur
Curtis Cup (representing the United States): 1986

Professional
Solheim Cup (representing the United States): 1992
Handa Cup (representing the United States): 2015 (winners)

References

External links

American female golfers
Arizona State Sun Devils women's golfers
LPGA Tour golfers
Solheim Cup competitors for the United States
Golfers from New York (state)
People from Babylon, New York
1965 births
Living people